The Bangladesh Mathematical Society is a learned society of mathematicians in Bangladesh.

History
The Bangladesh Mathematical Society was established in 1972. In 1974, the society started organising annual national mathematical conferences. It also publishes the GANIT: Journal of Bangladesh Mathematical Society. In the 1980s they voluntarily worked with National Curriculum and Textbook Board to re-write the mathematics textbook in Bangladesh. S. M. Azizul Haque, the head of mathematics department of Dhaka University, was the first president of the society.

List of Former Presidents
 Professor Sajeda Banu (2016-2017)
 Professor Dr. Nurul Alam Khan (2020-2021)
 Professor Dr. Md. Shahidul Islam (2022-2023)

References

1972 establishments in Bangladesh
Organisations based in Dhaka
Research institutes in Bangladesh
Learned societies of Bangladesh